Bo Diddley (1928–2008) was an American R&B vocalist, guitarist and songwriter.

Bo Diddley may also refer to:

 "Bo Diddley" (Bo Diddley song), 1955
 "Bo Diddley", 1993, a song by Emerson, Lake and Palmer, released on the boxed set The Return of the Manticore
 "Bo Diddley" (Arvingarna song), 1995
 Bo Diddley (1958 album)
 Bo Diddley (1962 album)
 Bo Diddley beat